Telemachos Karakalos (Dimitsana 1866 – 15 June 1951) was a Greek fencer.  He competed at the 1896 Summer Olympics in Athens.

Karakalos competed in the men's sabre event.  In the five-man, round-robin tournament, Karakalos won three of his four matches.  He defeated Georgios Iatridis, Adolf Schmal, and Holger Nielsen but lost to countryman Ioannis Georgiadis.  His 3-1 record put him in second place.

References

External links

1866 births
1951 deaths
Fencers at the 1896 Summer Olympics
19th-century sportsmen
Greek male fencers
Olympic silver medalists for Greece
Olympic fencers of Greece
Olympic medalists in fencing
Medalists at the 1896 Summer Olympics
People from Dimitsana
Date of birth missing
Place of death missing
Sportspeople from the Peloponnese